Mukat Behari Lal Bhargava (30 June 1903 – 18 December 1980 in Jaipur) was an Indian politician, Freedom fighter a member of the Indian National Congress political party and a member of the Lok Sabha from 1951 to 1967.

In 1928, Bhargava joined the Indian National Congress and the All India States Peoples Conference. He fought for the Indian independence and was jailed in quit India movement. He lost his eyesight when in jail. He was a member of Constituent Assembly of India in 1949. He was elected to the 1st Lok Sabha in 1951 from Ajmer South constituency in Ajmer state. He was elected to the 2nd and 3rd Lok Sabha from Ajmer constituency in Rajasthan state in 1957 and 1962 respectively. He was a well known lawyer of his times. He had an amazing memory.

References

1903 births
1980 deaths
20th-century Indian lawyers
Rajasthani people
Members of the Constituent Assembly of India
India MPs 1952–1957
India MPs 1957–1962
India MPs 1962–1967
Indian National Congress politicians from Rajasthan
Lok Sabha members from Rajasthan
Politicians from Jaipur
People from Ajmer district
Prisoners and detainees of British India